Polyommatus boisduvalii   is a  butterfly found in the  Palearctic (East Germany, Czech Republic, Poland, Southern Europe , Siberia, Kazakhstan Altai) that belongs to the blues family.

Taxonomy
Formerly a subspecies of Polyommatus eros.

Description from Seitz

The males of the South Russian form [ of eros] boisduvalii H.-Schaff. (80 d) have again a different blue, being paler, purer, brighter, the outer margin of the forewing is broadly black, the black veins in the apical area of the forewing being thin but sharply marked.

See also
List of butterflies of Russia

References

Polyommatus